was a Japanese-American meteorologist whose research primarily focused on severe weather. His research at the University of Chicago on severe thunderstorms, tornadoes, hurricanes, and typhoons revolutionized the knowledge of each. Although he is best known for creating the Fujita scale of tornado intensity and damage, he also discovered downbursts and microbursts, and was an instrumental figure in advancing modern understanding of many severe weather phenomena and how they affect people and communities, especially through his work exploring the relationship between wind speed and damage.

Biography
Fujita was born in the village of Sone, Fukuoka Prefecture, Japan, an area that is now part of the city of Kitakyushu. He studied and taught at Kyushu Institute of Technology. In 1953 he was invited to the University of Chicago by Horace R. Byers, who had become interested in Fujita's research, particularly his independent discovery of the cold-air downdraft. Fujita remained at the University of Chicago until his retirement in 1990.

Career
Fujita is recognized as the discoverer of downbursts and microbursts and also developed the Fujita scale, which differentiates tornado intensity and links tornado damage with wind speed.

Fujita's best-known contributions were in tornado research; he was often called "Mr. Tornado" by his associates and by the media. In addition to developing the Fujita scale, Fujita was a pioneer in the development of tornado overflight and damage survey techniques, which he used to study and map the paths of the two tornadoes that hit Lubbock, Texas on May 11, 1970. He established the value of photometric analysis of tornado pictures and films to establish wind speeds at various heights at the surface of tornado vortices. Fujita was also the first to widely study the meteorological phenomenon of the downburst, which can pose serious danger to aircraft. As a result of his work, in particular on Project NIMROD, pilot training worldwide routinely uses techniques he pioneered to provide instruction to students.

Fujita was also largely involved in developing the concept of multiple vortex tornadoes, which feature multiple small funnels (suction vortices) rotating within a larger parent cloud. His work established that, far from being rare events as was previously believed, most powerful tornadoes were composed of multiple vortices. He also advanced the concept of mini-swirls in intensifying tropical cyclones.

Ted Fujita died in his Chicago home on November 19, 1998. After his death, the American Meteorological Society (AMS) held the "Symposium on The Mystery of Severe Storms: A Tribute to the Work of T. Theodore Fujita" during its 80th Annual Meeting in January 2000 Storm Track magazine released a special November 1998 issue, "A Tribute To Dr. Ted Fujita" and Weatherwise published "Mr. Tornado: The life and career of Ted Fujita" as an article in its May/June 1999 issue. He was the subject of Mr. Tornado, a documentary film that originally aired on PBS American Experience on May 19, 2020.

World War II
Fujita was residing in Kokura during World War II. Kokura was the primary target for the "Fat Man" plutonium bomb, but on the morning of August 9, 1945, the city was obscured by clouds and smoke from the neighboring city of Yahata, which had been firebombed the day before. As a result, the bomb was dropped on the secondary target, Nagasaki. Studying the damage caused by the nuclear explosions contributed to Fujita's understanding of downbursts and microbursts as "starbursts" of wind hitting the Earth's surface and spreading out.

References

Sources

 
 Shanahan, J. A., and Fujita, T. T., 1971c. The Lubbock tornadoes and Fujita suction vortices. Presented at October 18–22, 1971, ASCE Annual and National Environmental Engineering meeting, St. Louis. [October 1971]
 
 Fujita, T. T., and Forbes, G. S., 1976f. Photogrammetric analysis of tornadoes, D. Three scales of motion involving tornadoes, in Peterson, R. E., ed., Proceedings of the Symposium on Tornadoes, Assessment of Knowledge and Implications for Man: Institute for Disaster Research, Texas Technological University, Lubbock, p. 53–57. [June 1976] (also issued as SMRP 140c)

Further reading

Memoirs

External links
 Tetsuya Fujita, 78, Inventor of Tornado Scale (The New York Times obituary)
 Dr. Tetsuya Theodore Fujita (The Tornado Project, 1998)
 Who was the legendary 'Mr. Tornado'? (AccuWeather, May 18, 2021)
 Oral History Interview with T.T. Fujita (interview by Richard Rotunno on February 2, 1988)
 Tornadoes and Severe Weather – In Memory of Tetsuya T. Fujita (Dr. Kazuya Fujita)
 Mr. Tornado: Tetsuya Theodore "Ted" Fujita (Bio by Keith C. Heidorn)
 Fujita publications (Texas Tech University)
 Fujita archival records (Southwest Collection/Special Collections Library at Texas Tech University)
 Video of presentation at Tornado Symposium III, 4 April 1991
 
 

1920 births
1998 deaths
American meteorologists
Japanese meteorologists
People from Kitakyushu
University of Tokyo alumni
University of Chicago faculty
American academics of Japanese descent
Japanese emigrants to the United States
Recipients of the Order of the Sacred Treasure, 2nd class
Naturalized citizens of the United States